The following is a list of episodes from the Nickelodeon television series, The Adventures of Pete & Pete.

The series began on November 28, 1993, and ended on April 1, 1996. A total of 34 episodes aired as well as 5 half-hour specials and 26 shorts. Currently, the first two seasons are available on DVD. The third season was planned for release but has been removed from Paramount's release schedule.

Series overview

Shorts
(Note: The original broadcast order is not known. However, "What Would You Do for a Dollar?" and "Freeze Tag" were the two earliest.)

 "What Would You Do for a Dollar? " — The Petes, Ellen, and a kid named Carl Slurm answer the title question. (Another character named Mr. Slurm would appear in "Tool and Die" and "Road Warrior.")
 "Freeze Tag" — Little Pete stays frozen after a night game of stocking freeze tag.
 "The Burping Room" — Dad, sick of Little Pete's constant burping, builds a special soundproof room.
 "Pete-Less" — Ellen is hurt when Big Pete insults her valentine.
 "Czechoslovakia" — The Petes convince their dad to drive them to Czechoslovakia for secret spy work.
 "Pete's Theory" — Little Pete is convinced that Santa Claus was the first man to swim the English Channel.
 "X-Mas Eve" — The Petes watch Dad open his present (a glow-in-the-dark discus) early and play with it all night.
 "The Dot" — Ellen is in tears after being yelled at by Mr. Putley, the marching band instructor. (Themes revisited in "Day of the Dot.")
 "The Big Race" — Mr. Wrigley and Mr. Hickle have a race. (Recreated in "Apocalypse Pete.")
 "Revenge of the Petes" — Artie battles the bully known as Hathead.
 "Mom's Plate" — A brief history of the metal plate in Mom's head.
 "Route 34" — Big Pete gets a horrible summer job mowing the grass along Route 34.
 "Artie, the Strongest Man... in the World!" — A little bit about the Petes' personal superhero.
 "Halloween" — Hathead returns to smash pumpkins, but is later foiled by Little Pete's superhero, Artie. (Themes revisited in "Halloweenie.")
 "X-Ray Man" — Little Pete gains x-ray vision after staring into a lunar eclipse.
 "The Punishment" — Dad punishes Little Pete for waxing the lawn. (Themes revisited in "Grounded for Life.")
 "The Launch" — The Petes and Ellen send a rocket into space.
 "Flossing" — The Petes use a new video camera to record their dad as he flosses.

Home video shorts
"The Artie Workout" — Self-explanatory. Created for the home video release "Classic Petes."
"StareMaster" — Little Pete offers tips for winning a staring contest, (see "When Petes Collide"). In the end, the viewer gets to go up against Little Pete. Made for the home video release "School Dazed."

Episodes

Specials (1991–93)
These episodes were produced prior to the first season.  When they originally aired, the opening credits were narrated by the character Ellen.  As part of the first season, these episodes were edited.  Several minutes of footage were removed, the opening and closing credits were replaced with the standard first season credits (depicting Polaris performing in a front lawn setting, intercut with clips from various episodes), and the licensed music was replaced with the songs within the show's stock music library.  All subsequent re-runs and releases have been the shorter "normalized" versions.

Season 1 (1993–94)
The opening credits for Season 1 consisted of many scenes, such as Little Pete sticking his head out of a car window, a closeup of Big Pete's face, Mom running across the field, shot of Mom's Plate, Dad looking all around, Ellen looking down, and looking up smiling, Artie standing up really high on a goalpost, and a shot of Petunia.

Season 2 (1994)
The opening credits for Season 2 consisted of many scenes, such as Little Pete riding a lawn mower, a shot of Big Pete looking up, Mom running in the wheatfield, a shot of Mom's Plate, Dad drinking coffee, Ellen holding flags, Artie leaping on the bowling ball, and a shot of Petunia.

Season 3 (1995–96)

References

Lists of American sitcom episodes
Lists of Nickelodeon television series episodes